Berkeley 87 is an open cluster in a heavily obscured region of the Milky Way in Cygnus. The rare WO type Wolf–Rayet star WR 142 is a member of Berkeley 87. 

This cluster contains HD 229059 which, as of August 2021, is the nearest known star to Earth with a Bolometric Luminosity greater than 1 million L☉.

References 

Open clusters
Cygnus (constellation)
Star-forming regions